Gmina Dębno may refer to either of the following administrative districts in Poland:
Gmina Dębno, Lesser Poland Voivodeship
Gmina Dębno, West Pomeranian Voivodeship